Sidney Douglas Morton (December 19, 1921 – January, 1993) was an American Negro league infielder in the 1940s.

A native of Washington, North Carolina, Morton broke into the Negro leagues in 1940 with the Philadelphia Stars. He went on to play for the Newark Eagles, Pittsburgh Crawfords, and Chicago American Giants. After his Negro league career, Morton played for the Elmwood Giants and Winnipeg Buffaloes of the Mandak League in 1951. Morton died in 1993 at age 71.

References

External links
 and Baseball-Reference Black Baseball stats and Seamheads
 Sy Morton at Negro League Baseball Players Association

1921 births
1993 deaths
Chicago American Giants players
Newark Eagles players
Philadelphia Stars players
Pittsburgh Crawfords players
People from Washington, North Carolina
Baseball players from North Carolina
20th-century African-American sportspeople
Baseball infielders